The 1925 Drexel Dragons football team was an American football team that represented Drexel University as an independent during the 1925 college football season. In its fourth season under head coach Harry J. O'Brien, Drexel compiled a 1–7 record.

Schedule

Roster

References

Drexel
Drexel Dragons football seasons
Drexel Dragons football